The Organic centre-left was a coalition of four Italian political parties that formed governments throughout the 1960s and the middle 1970s. The word "organic" meant that the Italian Socialist Party was fully part of the government, it was within the "organization" of the cabinet, differently from other centre-left governments in the early 1960s, where the PSI gave an external support only.

History
In 1962 the Christian Democracy (DC) leader Amintore Fanfani formed a cabinet with members of the Italian Social Democratic Party (PSDI) and the Italian Republican Party (PRI); it is considered the beginning of the Organic centre-left. The Fanfani cabinet, even if it cannot be considered a traditional centre-left government, approved many social reforms, such as the nationalisation of industries like ENEL, which are considered left-leaning policies.

On 4 December 1963, Aldo Moro formed the first centre-left government with the support of the Italian Socialist Party (PSI). Prominent socialist politicians, such as Pietro Nenni and Antonio Giolitti, were appointed ministers.

In 1968 Moro resigned as Prime Minister and the new Premier, Giovanni Leone, formed a cabinet composed only of DC members.

After few years the Christian Democratic leader Mariano Rumor, proposed a new government coalition composed of centre-left parties. The Rumor cabinets approved the divorce law, a new Workers' Statute, the creation of the Antimafia Commission and a reform to give more powers and autonomy to the Regions.

The coalition still judged the Italian Communist Party and the Italian Social Movement as too extreme for participation in government. Internationally, the coalition relied on a strong pro-Europeanism and atlanticism from a pro-Arab policy, (Craxi and Andreotti). This fact caused many frictions between the Liberals and the Socialists, and was one of the causes of disintegration of the coalition. The coalition also adopted a pro-China policy, as it established foreign relations with the People's Republic of China in 1970.

The successor of the organic centre-left was the Pentapartito, a coalition between the four parties that formed the centre-left coalition with the Italian Liberal Party.

Programme
The coalition programme was based on an extensive reformist agenda:
 Extension of compulsory education from elementary school to secondary school
 Free school books
 Nationalization of the electric industry
 Creation of Enel
 Divorce Law (1970), refused by the DC despite the 1974 referendum
 Worker's Statute Law
 Creation of the Antimafia Commission
 Creation of the Regions (Decentralization)

Composition

Electoral results

Italian Parliament

References

Aldo Moro
Defunct political party alliances in Italy